Neith may refer to:

Neith, an Egyptian goddess
Neith (wife of Pepi II), one of three principal queens of the Old Kingdom pharaoh Pepi II, who ruled (c. 2278 BC–c. 2184 BC).
Neith (moon), a hypothetical moon of Venus
Neith (crater), a crater on Jupiter's moon Ganymede
Neith, the Orbital Frame of Viola in the Zone of the Enders game by Konami
1122 Neith, an asteroid